Lillias Rumsey Sanford (1850-1940) was the founder of Rumsey Hall School, the second private nondenominational pre-preparatory school in the United States, originally located in Seneca Falls, New York.

1850 births
1940 deaths